Kryptonesticus is a genus of European scaffold web spiders first described by Pavlek & Ribera in 2017, based around the newly-described type species Kryptonesticus deelemanae and seven species transferred from genus Nesticus. In 2018, an additional species, K. georgescuae, was described from two female specimens from Romania.

With the exception of K. eremita, individual species have very restricted ranges.

Species 
Kryptonesticus comprises the following species, per the World Spider Catalog:
 Kryptonesticus arenstorffi (Kulczyński, 1914) — Bosnia-Hercegovina
 Kryptonesticus beroni (Deltshev, 1977) — Bulgaria
 Kryptonesticus beshkovi (Deltshev, 1979) — Crete
 Kryptonesticus deelemanae Pavlek & Ribera, 2017 — Croatia
 Kryptonesticus dimensis (López-Pancorbo, Kunt & Ribera, 2013) — Turkey
 Kryptonesticus eremita (Simon, 1879) — Europe; introduced in New Zealand
 Kryptonesticus fagei (Kratochvíl, 1933) — Italy, Montenegro
 Kryptonesticus georgescuae Nae et. al, 2018 — Romania
 Kryptonesticus henderickxi (Bosselaers, 1998) — Crete

References 

Nesticidae
Araneomorphae genera